Elisabetta Fanton (born 26 December 1968) is an Italian former cyclist. She competed in the women's sprint event at the 1988 Summer Olympics.

References

External links
 

1968 births
Living people
Italian female cyclists
Olympic cyclists of Italy
Cyclists at the 1988 Summer Olympics
Sportspeople from Treviso
Cyclists from the Province of Treviso